Gammarus bousfieldi is a species of crustacean in family Gammaridae. It is endemic to the United States.

References

Freshwater crustaceans of North America
Crustaceans of the United States
Crustaceans described in 1961
bousfieldi
Taxonomy articles created by Polbot